Selkirk is a Scottish surname. The name is a habitational name, derived from Selkirk, located on the Scottish Borders. The place name is derived from the Middle English elements sale, sele, meaning "hall", "manor"; and kirk, meaning "church". The Scottish Gaelic form of the surname is Sailcirc (masculine), and Shailcirc (feminine).

List of people with the surname
Alexander Selkirk (1676–1721), a Scottish sailor who spent four years as a castaway when he was marooned on an uninhabited island; he is supposed to be inspiration for Daniel Defoe's Robinson Crusoe (1719)
Andrew Selkirk (born ?), British archaeologist and magazine editor
Elisabeth Selkirk (born 1945), American theoretical linguist 
George Selkirk (1908–1987), Canadian baseball player
J. B. Selkirk (James Brown Selkirk; 1832–1904), Scottish poet and essayist
Jamie Selkirk (born 1947), New Zealand film editor and producer
John Selkirk (1782–1843), British songwriter
Neil Selkirk (born 1947), British-born American photographer
Patricia Margaret Selkirk (born 1942), Australian plant biologist and ecologist
Rebecca Selkirk (born 1993), South African chess player
Russell Selkirk (1905–1993), American politician

References

Scottish surnames
Scottish Gaelic-language surnames